Jorge Fidel Ponce (born 30 November 1967) is a Honduran sprinter. He competed in the men's 400 metres at the 1988 Summer Olympics.

References

External links
 

1967 births
Living people
Athletes (track and field) at the 1988 Summer Olympics
Honduran male sprinters
Honduran male hurdlers
Olympic athletes of Honduras
Place of birth missing (living people)